The Poultry Science Association (PSA) is an American non-profit professional organization for the advancement of poultry science. Founded in 1908, the PSA is headquartered in Champaign, Illinois.

Consisting of 1800 members, PSA is involved in research, education, nutrition, and processing of poultry-based products, including chicken, quail, turkey, and duck. Its two journals are Poultry Science and Journal of Applied Poultry Research.

Its youngest ever President was Prof Frederick Hutt of the University of Minnesota in 1932 (then aged 34).

See also

Poultry farming in the United States

References

External link

1908 establishments in the United States
Agricultural organizations based in the United States
Food technology organizations
Non-profit organizations based in the United States
Organizations based in Illinois
Poultry farming in the United States
Poultry organizations
Research institutes in the United Nations System
Research organizations in the United States
Science and technology in Illinois
Science and technology in the United States